Cerro Bayo is a mountain of the Andes range located 9 km from the town Villa La Angostura, Neuquén Province, Argentina, within the Valdivian temperate rain forests, in an area with numerous lakes.
The mountain hosts a ski area with 25 runs and 16 lifts. In 2007, the 2nd South American Ski Mountaineering Championship was carried out on the Cerro Bayo.

See also 

 Cerro Castor
 Cerro Catedral
 Chapelco
 Las Leñas
 List of ski areas and resorts in South America

References

Landforms of Neuquén Province
Mountains of Argentina
Ski areas and resorts in Argentina